Knoxosaurus is an extinct genus of non-mammalian synapsids containing the species Knoxosaurus niteckii that existed approximately 279.5 to 268 million years ago. It was named by American paleontologist Everett C. Olson in 1962 on the basis of fragmentary fossils from Middle Permian-age deposits in the San Angelo Formation of Texas in the United States. Olson placed Knoxosaurus in a new infraorder called Eotheriodontia, which he considered a transitional group between the more reptile-like "pelycosaurs" and the more mammal-like therapsids. Knoxosaurus and Olson's other eotheriodonts were later considered to be undiagnostic remains of basal synapsids, no more closely related to therapsids than are other pelycosaur-grade synapsids.

See also

 List of therapsids

References

Prehistoric synapsid genera
Guadalupian synapsids of North America
Fossil taxa described in 1962
Taxa named by Everett C. Olson